Thrive (formerly Audiences NI) is an audience development agency established in August 2004 by the Arts Council of Northern Ireland to grow and diversify audiences for the arts in Northern Ireland.

References

External links
Thrive

Art in Northern Ireland
Cultural organisations based in Northern Ireland
Arts organizations established in 2004
2004 establishments in Northern Ireland